The String Quartet No. 5 in A major, Op. 18, No. 5, was written between 1798 and 1800 by Ludwig van Beethoven and published in 1801, and dedicated to Joseph Franz von Lobkowitz. Beethoven modeled this quartet directly on Mozart's quartet in the same key, K. 464.

Movements
The string quartet consists of four movements:

Recordings

Notes

References
 ; especially the essay by Michael Steinberg (pp. 150–155)

External links 

 

String quartet 05
1800 compositions
Compositions in A major